The Dark Angel is a 1925 American silent drama film, based on the play The Dark Angel, a Play of Yesterday and To-day by H. B. Trevelyan, released by First National Pictures, and starring Ronald Colman, Vilma Bánky (in her first American film), and Wyndham Standing.

Plot

During the First World War, Captain Alan Trent, while on leave in England with his fiancée Kitty Vane, is suddenly recalled to the front before being able to get a marriage license. Alan and Kitty spend a night of love at a country inn "without benefit of clergy" and he sets off.

At the front things go badly for Alan, who is blinded and becomes a Prisoner of War after being captured by the Germans. He is reported dead, and his friend, Captain Gerald Shannon, discreetly woos Kitty, seeking to soothe her grief with his gentle love.

After the war, however, Gerald discovers that Alan is still alive, in a remote corner of England, writing children's stories for a living. Loyal to his former comrade in arms, Gerald informs Kitty of Alan's reappearance. She goes to him, and Alan conceals his blindness and tells Kitty that he no longer cares for her. She sees through his deception, however, and they are reunited.

Cast

Reception
The film has a 100% fresh rating on Rotten Tomatoes, based on 9 positive contemporary reviews.

Mordaunt Hall's October 12, 1925, review for The New York Times conveys what made this film a compelling success 7 years after the end of the First World War.

Preservation
A print of The Dark Angel has been recently located in a film archive, so it is currently not considered a lost film.

See also
List of lost films

References

External links

Stills at silenthollywood.com
Still at silentfilmstillarchive.com

1925 films
American black-and-white films
American silent feature films
1925 romantic drama films
American films based on plays
American World War I films
War romance films
Films set in England
Lost American films
First National Pictures films
Samuel Goldwyn Productions films
American romantic drama films
Films directed by George Fitzmaurice
1925 lost films
Lost romantic drama films
1920s American films
Silent romantic drama films
Silent war films
Silent American drama films
1920s English-language films